Eduardo Dibós Dammert, (1898 – 1987, Lima) was a Peruvian politician from the late 1930s to the early 1950s. He was the mayor of Lima twice: first, from 1938 to 1940 and second, from 1950 to 1952.

The arena Coliseo Eduardo Dibos in San Borja District is named after him.

His son Eduardo "Chachi" Dibós Chappuis was also Mayor of Lima from 1970 to 1973.

References

Mayors of Lima
1898 births
1987 deaths
People from Lima
Peruvian people of French descent